This is a list of defunct airlines of Cameroon.

See also

 List of airlines of Cameroon
 List of airports in Cameroon

References

Cameroon
Airlines
Airlines, defunct